Camp Forrest, located in a wooded area east of the city of  Tullahoma, Tennessee, was one of the U.S. Army's largest training bases during World War II. It was an active army post between 1941 and 1946.

History
The camp, named after Civil War cavalry Confederate General Nathan Bedford Forrest, was originally named Camp Peay. Camp Peay was named after the Tennessee Governor Austin Peay and built near Tullahoma as a National Guard Camp in 1926.  Camp Peay covered . Camp Forrest covered  located just beyond the old Camp Peay.

The camp was a training area for infantry, artillery, engineer, signal organizations, and cooks. It also served as a hospital center and temporary encampment area for troops during maneuvers. Major General George Patton brought his 2nd Armored Division from Fort Benning, Georgia for maneuvers.

William Northern Field, an air training base, was an addition used as a training site for crews of four-engined B-24 bombers of the Army Air Forces.

Incoming troops had amenities typical of military installations of the era; these included service clubs, guest houses, a library, post exchanges, a post office, hospital facilities, a chapel, theater, and barracks buildings.  The camp was also home to Red Cross and Army Emergency Relief facilities. Recreation facilities included swimming, archery, tennis, a sports arena and a nine-hole golf course.

Camp Forrest officially became a prisoner-of-war camp on May 12, 1942. The camp housed Italian and German POWs. Prisoners became laborers at Camp Forrest in the hospitals and on farms in the local community. The camp also held Japanese, German and Italian American civilians who were arrested at the outbreak of the war under a program called "Alien Enemy Control". Many of these internees were incarcerated without legal process. Official government documents made available in the late 1990s indicate that over 25,000 "alien enemies" were held at various locations throughout the United States. Camp Forrest's population was over 700, of whom approximately 200 were of Japanese ancestry. German internees at Camp Forrest published a newsletter titled The Latrine. In 1943, Camp Forrest internees were transferred to other internment camps to make room for actual POWs captured on the field of battle.

In 1945, the U.S. government implemented an Intellectual Diversion Program to educate Germans on the American way of life. This program used educational and recreational media to change views of POWs, and the government claimed success with many prisoners.

Tullahoma was greatly affected by the installation of Camp Forrest. The acreage used, for both Camp Peay and Camp Forrest, came from federal government confiscations from area families who had owned and worked the land for generations. This was usually done with little or no monetary compensation for those families. (One such family is the Baytes/Bates family of Franklin & Coffee Counties.) Because of maneuvers and operations, civilians had to adjust to blocked roads, traffic jams, crowded stores, the absence of mail delivery and driving at night without lights. Soldiers camped out on lawns and fields; many crops and fences were destroyed (without any compensation to the owners).

In 1940, the population in Tullahoma was 4,500. By the end of the war, the population had grown to 75,000. Many military people who moved in for construction and operation of the camp remained after the war. The sudden increase of population caused a drastic cost-of-living increase for the original inhabitants. Property values, property taxes, and everyday necessities all increased dramatically.

In 1946, the war was over and Camp Forrest and Northern Field were declared surplus property. Buildings were sold at auction, torn down and carted away. Water and sewage systems and electrical systems were sold as salvage. All that remained were roads, brick chimneys and concrete foundations. The camp's Sports Arena was bought by Lincoln Memorial University and moved to Harrogate, Tennessee, where it was rechristened as the Mary E. Mars Gymnasium. The building is still in use today by the school's volleyball teams and their academy's athletic teams and classes.

Soon after the close of the camp, instead of reverting ownership of the land back to the original owners, the area was selected for the site of the Air Force's new Air Engineering Development Center. In 1951, the center was dedicated by President Truman and renamed the Arnold Engineering Development Center in honor of General of the Air Force Henry H. "Hap" Arnold. General Arnold was World War II Commander of the Army Air Corps and the only air force officer to hold 5-star rank.

See also
 Arnold Engineering Development Complex

References

 Camp Forrest. Arnold Engineering Development Center, Arnold Air Force Base, TN

External links

 http://www.campforrest.com/
 https://web.archive.org/web/20091229205732/http://www.arnold.af.mil/shared/media/document/AFD-070213-027.pdf

Buildings and structures in Coffee County, Tennessee
Buildings and structures in Franklin County, Tennessee
World War II internment camps in the United States
World War II prisoner of war camps in the United States
1941 establishments in Tennessee
1946 disestablishments in Tennessee
Nathan Bedford Forrest
Installations of the U.S. Army in Tennessee
Military installations closed in 1946